Bharta may refer to:

Geography

India
Bharta, Hoshiarpur, a census village in Hoshiarpur district in the state of Punjab, India.
Bharta Khurd, a village in Shaheed Bhagat Singh Nagar district of Punjab State, India.
Bharta Kalan, a village in Shaheed Bhagat Singh Nagar district of Punjab State, India.
Ganeshpur Bharta, a census village in Hoshiarpur district in the state of Punjab, India.

Nepal
Bharta, Nepal, a village development committee in Kalikot district in the Karnali Zone of north-western Nepal.
Bharta Pundyadevi, a village development committee in Makwanpur district in the Narayani Zone of southern Nepal.

Dish
Baingan bharta
Bhurta, also called bharta